Glorieux was a 74-gun ship of the line in the French Navy.  Built by Clairin Deslauriers at Rochefort and launched on 10 August 1756, she was rebuilt in 1777.

French service
On 4 June 1781 Glorieux captured the cutter .

On 30 August 1781, she was with the French fleet under Admiral de Grasse. According to French sources, the British sloop  and the frigate  were on picket duty in the Chesapeake when they encountered the French fleet. Guadeloupe escaped up the York River to York Town, where she would later be scuttled. The English court martial records report that Loyalist was returning to the British fleet off the Jersey coast when she encountered the main French fleet. The French frigate Aigrette, with the 74-gun  in sight, was able to overtake Loyalist. The French took her into service as Loyaliste in September, but then gave her to the Americans in November 1781.

On 12 April 1782 the ship, under command of Captain (Baron) D'Escars, faced first HMS Duke then  at the Battle of the Saintes. In her approach she nailed her white colours to the mast and a sergeant of the Auxerrois regiment tied his halberd and bravely stood at the head of the ship waving it. When shot in his right arm, he deftly caught the halberd in his left hand and continued to wave. He was later made an officer for his bravery. Following the battle, despite the attempts of Denis Decrès aboard Richemont (previously a British ship) to give tow to the stricken vessel, she was captured.

Towed instead to a British controlled port she was recommissioned her into the Royal Navy as HMS Glorieux or HMS Glorious the following day. She was rated as a third rate.

Fate
She sailed with the fleet for England on 25 July 1782 but was lost later that year in a hurricane storm off Newfoundland on 16–17 September, along with the other captured French prize ships  and Hector. Glorieux was lost with all hands, including her captain, Thomas Cadogan, son of Charles Cadogan, 3rd Baron Cadogan.

Other
Heller SA has created a 1:150 scale model of Le Glorieux in its French guise.

See also

Citations

References

Demerliac, Alain (1996) La Marine De Louis XVI: Nomenclature Des Navires Français De 1774 À 1792. (Nice: Éditions OMEGA). 

Winfield, Rif, British Warships of the Age of Sail 1714–1792: Design, Construction, Careers and Fates, pub Seaforth, 2007,

External links
Ronald Deschênes, "Jacques Kanon"

Ships of the line of the French Navy
Ships of the line of the Royal Navy
Shipwrecks in the Atlantic Ocean
1756 ships
Maritime incidents in 1782